Dowse Lagoon is a park and lake located in Sandgate, Queensland, a suburb of Brisbane. It was given its name in 1975, and it is named for Thomas Dowse, a merchant and early settler of Brisbane. Before 1975, it was largely known as the "Second Lagoon". It was named as a Ramsar site in 1993. Dowse Lagoon was badly damaged by the 2000s Australian drought, which led to calls for its revitilisation.

References

Lakes of Queensland
Sandgate, Queensland